Kevin Eugene McKenzie (born September 20, 1975) is a former American football wide receiver in the National Football League and Arena Football League. He was signed by the Philadelphia Eagles as an undrafted free agent in 1998. He played college football at Washington State.

McKenzie also played for the Miami Dolphins, Florida Bobcats, San Jose SaberCats, Colorado Crush and Arizona Rattlers.

High school and collegiate football
Born in Los Angeles, California, McKenzie went to Woodrow Wilson high school in Long Beach and played college football at Washington State University. He received a B.A. degree from Washington State and went on to complete an A.A. degree in physical education in California.

Life after football
McKenzie became an AAAISMA certified personal trainer in 2008. His fitness brand, Fit Squad, launched in 2016. He is also a little league coach and runs speed and agility programs for athletes.  He volunteers with the ARCH foundation for children with down syndrome and the Ed MacCaffery "Dare to Play" football camp at Valor high.

References

External links
Pro-Football Reference
Kevin McKenzie Personal Training

1975 births
Living people
American football wide receivers
Washington State Cougars football players
Philadelphia Eagles players
Miami Dolphins players
Florida Bobcats players
San Jose SaberCats players
Colorado Crush players
Arizona Rattlers players